Phineas and Ferb: Ride Again is a platform video game based on the television series Phineas and Ferb, and a sequel of the video game Phineas and Ferb, developed by Altron and published by Disney Interactive Studios for the Nintendo DS console. It was released in North America on September 14, 2010, and later in PAL regions on April 1, 2011. It continues with the two inventor brothers, Phineas and Ferb, making another four big projects, including a rockin' skateboard course and a spaceship. Meanwhile, Perry wants to foil Dr. Doofenshmirtz's plans.

Gameplay
Players can now play as Perry to save the world by battling Dr. Doofenshmirtz's robots and henchmen. Players can also play as Candace through mazes, trampolines, lily pads, and more and upgrade their gadgets from the first game for more power.

Reception
Reception was generally positive, receiving a score of 86.50% based on 2 reviews. Game Vortex's Ricky Tucker gave the game a 93/100, concluding: "Phineas & Ferb Ride Again is easily one of the better-licensed games to hit in the last few years and a must-buy for fans regardless of age".

References

External links
Official site

2010 video games
Altron games
Nintendo DS games
Nintendo DS-only games
Ride Again
Platform games
Disney video games
Video games developed in Japan
Multiplayer and single-player video games